Wet 'n Wild Orlando was the flagship water park of Wet 'n Wild owned by NBC Universal, located on International Drive in Orlando, Florida. It was founded in 1977 by SeaWorld creator George Millay. It closed on December 31, 2016.

History

Development and ownership
While developing SeaWorld, George Millay realized the need for a water park, later recalling "being in Florida, with all its heat and hot sun, you naturally think about cooling off in water". In the mid-1970s, he directed his time and money towards the project. The idea stemmed from the splash pad at Ontario Place in Canada and the wave pool at Point Mallard Park in Alabama. His desire was to combine these two elements and build upon it in order to achieve a good return on investment. Due to his prior success with SeaWorld, he was able to form a team of investors to fund the project.

The park opened in Orlando, Florida on March 13, 1977. Although it opened to rain and suffered a $600,000 loss in its first year of operation, Millay kept it open. He later claimed it "started making money the second year and never looked back". The success of the park spawned several other Wet 'n Wild-branded parks across the Americas.

In 1998, Millay sold off his interests in his parks. The Orlando location was purchased by Universal Studios Recreation Group, who continued to lease the land on which it is located.

Expansion and later years

In 1998, the Hydra Fighter was added to the park. Riders were able to control their suspended gondola through the use of high-powered water guns.

In 2000, the park renovated their Kids Park children's area. The original aviation theme was converted into a sandcastle theme. The renovation saw three ProSlide Technology "Kidz" slides added as well as a castle with a tipping bucket which dumped  of water every three-and-a-half minutes. With the exception of the three slides, it was manufactured entirely by Integrity Attractions.

In 2001, the park began a multi-year expansion plan with Canadian manufacturer ProSlide Technology. It added The Storm, a pair of ProBowls, in 2001; The Blast, an inline tube slide, in 2003; Disco H2O, an enclosed Behemoth Bowl, in 2005; and Brain Wash, an enclosed Tornado, in 2008.

In 2011, the Kids Park was demolished. In 2012, it was replaced by Blastaway Beach, a larger children's water play area, also themed around sandcastles.

In 2014, the Bubba Tub was removed and replaced with the Aqua Drag Racer, a four-lane race slide.

On June 17, 2015, it was confirmed that the park would close on December 31, 2016, to be replaced by a new water park, Universal's Volcano Bay. The park permanently closed on December 31, 2016, and was demolished from February 2017 to June 2017. Volcano Bay opened across the site on May 25, 2017.

The former site of Wet N' Wild became a resort known as Universal's Endless Summer Resort which opened in June 2019.

Attendance
The park was the most-attended water park in the United States until 1999, when Walt Disney World Resort's Typhoon Lagoon and Blizzard Beach surpassed it. At the time, it was averaging around 1.3 million visitors for several years.

Attractions

Final attractions

Former attractions

In popular culture
The park was featured on Travel Channel's Extreme Waterparks and was also the setting for the music video for "Se a vida é", by the Pet Shop Boys.

The park was featured for Puerto Rican band Menudo for their video Nao Se Reprima in Portuguese.

See also
 List of water parks

References

External links

 (archive)

1977 establishments in Florida
Universal Orlando
Universal Parks & Resorts
Water parks in Florida
Amusement parks opened in 1977
Amusement parks closed in 2016
2016 disestablishments in Florida
Defunct amusement parks in Florida